Alcinópolis is a municipality located in the Brazilian state of Mato Grosso do Sul. Its population was 5,417 (2020) and its area is 4,400 km².

The municipality contains 82.7% of the  Nascentes do Rio Taquari State Park, created in 1999.

References

Municipalities in Mato Grosso do Sul